Canton Bend, once known simply as Canton, is an unincorporated community in Wilcox County, Alabama, United States.  Located on the south bank of the Alabama River, it served as the first county seat for Wilcox County from 1819 until its move to Camden in 1833.  It has several historic sites, including Youpon Plantation and the Tristram Bethea House.

Geography

References

Unincorporated communities in Alabama
Unincorporated communities in Wilcox County, Alabama